Laura Deloose (born 18 June 1993) is a Belgian footballer who plays for Anderlecht and the Belgium national team.

International career
She played for Belgium at UEFA Women's Euro 2017 and again at UEFA Women's Euro 2022.

Career statistics

International

References

External links
 
 

1993 births
Living people
Belgian women's footballers
Belgium women's international footballers
Women's association football defenders
Super League Vrouwenvoetbal players
RSC Anderlecht (women) players
People from Bornem
Footballers from Antwerp Province
UEFA Women's Euro 2022 players
UEFA Women's Euro 2017 players